Piotr Parzyszek (born 8 September 1993) is a Polish professional footballer who plays as a forward for Segunda División club Leganés.

Career

De Graafschap
Born in Toruń, Poland, Parzyszek started his career with Dutch side De Graafschap in 2012. In January 2014, he received attention from several teams, including Benfica, West Ham United and Nantes. He played 52 league matches for De Graafschap in which he scored 29 times.

Charlton Athletic
On 30 January 2014, it was announced Parzyszek had been sold to Championship side Charlton Athletic. He made his first and what turned out to be only appearance for the club as a late substitute against Birmingham City on 8 February 2014.

On 3 February 2016, it was confirmed that Parzyszek had been released from his contract.

Sint-Truiden (loan)
Parzyszek was loaned out in the summer of 2014 for one season to Sint-Truiden where he scored two goals on his debut.

Randers (loan)
Parzyszek was loaned out again in the summer of 2015 for one season to Randers.

Parzyszek's loan contract was terminated on 1 February 2016, after the club announced, that it was Parzyszek's own request.

Frosinone
On 29 September 2020, he joined Italian Serie B side Frosinone. On 29 August 2022, he was released by the club.

Pogoń Szczecin (loan)
On 12 July 2021, he joined Pogoń Szczecin on a season-long loan.

Leganés
On 1 September 2022, Leganés announced an agreement in principle with Parzyszek on a two-year deal, pending legal procedures.

Career statistics

Club

<div>

Honours

Club

Piast Gliwice
Ekstraklasa: 2018–19

References

External links
 
 
 

1993 births
Living people
Sportspeople from Toruń
Polish footballers
Association football forwards
Poland under-21 international footballers
Poland youth international footballers
De Graafschap players
Charlton Athletic F.C. players
Sint-Truidense V.V. players
Randers FC players
PEC Zwolle players
Piast Gliwice players
Frosinone Calcio players
Pogoń Szczecin players
CD Leganés players
Eredivisie players
Eerste Divisie players
English Football League players
Challenger Pro League players
Danish Superliga players
Ekstraklasa players
Serie B players
Segunda División players
Polish expatriate footballers
Expatriate footballers in the Netherlands
Expatriate footballers in England
Expatriate footballers in Belgium
Expatriate men's footballers in Denmark
Expatriate footballers in Italy
Expatriate footballers in Spain
Polish expatriate sportspeople in the Netherlands
Polish expatriate sportspeople in England
Polish expatriate sportspeople in Belgium
Polish expatriate sportspeople in Denmark
Polish expatriate sportspeople in Italy
Polish expatriate sportspeople in Spain